Zavodskoe Airport   is situated at a distance of  southwest of Simferopol, the capital city of the Autonomous Republic of Crimea. It was built in 1914 as part of an aircraft factory "Anatra". It is class D unpaved airdrome. It operates during daylight hours.

History
During times of the Soviet Union, an airline club and a school of civil pilots was established there. Many graduates became Heroes of the Soviet Union.

In March 1941, an aviation enterprise was founded to carry out the special type of aviation works. Until the 1990s, the airport has scheduled air transportation of passengers and cargo to the Crimea and in the neighboring area. For some time there has been an air base

At Ukraine's age the main activity of the enterprise "Universal-Avia" are United Nations and NATO contracts to work in central Africa and Asia. Skilled engineers and technicians of C and B categories have wide experience of operation of aircraft in all regions of the world. They can independently perform any type of maintenance without inspector's check or inspector's presence. Many specialists have permission to maintenance of helicopters Mil Mi-8AMT, Mi-17, Mi-171, Mi-172, and Mi-26.

The airport also runs sightseeing flights to Crimean tourist locations.

During the Crimean crisis military helicopters were based at the airport.

References

External links
 "Universal-Avia"

Airports built in the Soviet Union
Airports in Crimea
Simferopol
Buildings and structures in Crimea
Ukrainian airbases